Aggie (or Agie), was launched in Liverpool in 1777. She traded locally until 1781 when her owners renamed her Spy. She briefly became a privateer, and then a slave ship, engaged in the triangular trade in enslaved people. The French Navy captured her in 1782 in the West Indies as she was arriving to deliver her cargo of slaves on her first slave-trading voyage.

Career
Agie first appeared in Lloyd's Register (LR) in 1778.

Slave trading voyage: Captain John Burrows sailed Spy from Liverpool in July 1781, bound for West Africa.

Fate
On 4 June 1782 two French frigates captured Spy, Burrows, master, and took her into Dominica. She was carrying 250 slaves and six tons of ivory.

Citations

1777 ships
Age of Sail merchant ships of England
Privateer ships of Great Britain
Liverpool slave ships
Captured ships